The Chile men's national volleyball team represents Chile in international volleyball competitions and friendly matches.

History
In 1961 the squad claimed the silver medal at the South American Championship in Lima, Perú.

Chile has played a one World Championship competition, in 1982 in Argentina, where it was eliminated in the Main Round. This team played in the Pool B with Soviet Union, United States and Bulgaria.

Results

Challenger Cup
 2018 – 5th place
 2019 – 6th place
 2022 – 8th place

See also
Chile women's national volleyball team

External links
Fevochi

Volleyball
National men's volleyball teams
Men's sport in Chile
Volleyball in Chile